Kastamonu Province is one of the provinces of Turkey, in the Black Sea region to the north of the country. It is surrounded by Sinop to the east, Bartın, Karabük to the west, Çankırı to the south, Çorum to the southeast and the Black Sea to the north.

Statistics 
19th largest province by land area, the province has an area of 13,108 km2, and 51st largest province by population. Kastamonu hosts 322,759 people (2006 est). The population was 361,222 people in 2010. The population density is 24.62 inhabitants per km2. The province center has a population of 64,606.

Districts

Kastamonu province is divided into 20 districts (capital district in bold):

History
It is not definitively known when Kastamonu was first founded. However, some sources dating back to the Early Middle Ages refer to the province. There are also some archeological findings that date to about 100,000 years that suggest the region was inhabited at that time.

There are theories that the word Kastamonu derives from Castra Comnenus, the Latin name of the Byzantine castle built by the Comnenus dynasty.

With the weakening of the Macedon kings, the Paphlagonia and Bithynia regions were engulfed by the newly formed Pontus kingdom. After the fall of the Pontus kingdom in first century BC, the area was incorporated by the Roman Empire by joining Paphlagonia with Bithynia. The capital center of this new city-state was Pompeiopolis, of which the remains still stand near Tasköprü District in Kastamonu.

The region then fell under the hegemony of the Seljuq dynasty (11th century AD), followed by the Danishmends, the Byzantines during the crusades, Çobanoğlu and Jandarid beyliks. The Ottoman sultan Beyazid I conquered the province in 1392; however, following his capture and death in Battle of Ankara, the area was granted back to the Çandaroğlu by the Mongol warlord Timur Lenk. Ottoman sultan Mehmed II incorporated the region back into the empire in 1461.

During the Ottoman reign, the province boundaries were expanded up to reach Constantinople. The sultan's heirs were often sent to rule the province as governors to gain experience.

After the First World War, during the battles of the Turkish War of Independence, Kastamonu played an important role in the supply of ammunition and troops to the İnebolu–Ankara front, transporting the war machines that would arrive to İnebolu by sea from Istanbul (Constantinople) and the Soviets. When the Greeks noticed this activity, the İnebolu port was bombarded from the sea on 9 June 1921.

Highlights 

The province is mostly covered with forests, thanks to the mild Black Sea climate. Ilgaz National Park, where a micro-climate dominates due to the mountainous terrain and numerous streams, is 63 km south of the province center of Kastamonu. There is also a ski center with accommodation facilities located near the park.

Ilgaz Mountain (highest peak 2587 m) dominates the south of the province where hiking and whitewater rafting is possible at the Ilgaz Stream. The Ilgarini cave at Cide, the Alinca cave at Küre and the International Equestrian Tourism Center of Daday are other notable attractions.

A 12th-century Byzantine castle, the 13th-century Atabey Mosque and the Ibni Neccar Mosque also located in the province. The Mahmut Bey Mosque, located in the village of Kasaba is known for its elegant wood carvings.

Gideros Bay, 13 km to Cide, is a holiday resort with pensions and fish restaurants. 

The ruins of the Roman city-state Pompeiopolis are found near Taşköprü.

Kastamonu also has many mansions, which are traditionally built with an architectural style unique to this region. Many of these mansions have been restored following a 2000 declaration by the local government to preserve the historical texture.

Economy 
According to the 2000 census, 77.5% of the labor force is occupied in agriculture. This ratio is higher than the country average. The second largest sector is public and private services (8.9%).

Almost all of the arable land has permanent crops. The agricultural products make up about of 0.01% of the total in Turkey. A large portion of the agricultural produce consists of cereals. Thanks to its widespread forest areas (a total of 57% of the surface area), forestry is also an important industry. Industries largely consist of manufacturing of forestry, agriculture and mining products.

Underground resources include copper, mercury, iron ore, chromium, manganese, asbestos, bauxite, graphite, phosphate, kaolinite, clay, limestone, quartz, marble, magnesite, fire clay, coal and nickel. There are also some natural thermal and mineral water springs, of which a few are suitable for economic investments.

Kastamonu shares about 0.4% of the GDP, the composition of the GDP is as follows (1998 est.):
Agriculture: 32.8%
Communication and transport: 20%
Services: 16.8%
Industry: 9.5%

Transportation is possible only through paved and unpaved highways; a railroad that will connect Çankırı, Kastamonu and İnebolu is under construction. Although the province has a 135 km long coastline to Black Sea, only İnebolu has a small port and transportation by the sea is almost non-existent.

There are around 112,000 telephone main lines in use, about 200,000 cellphone subscribers and 15,000 Internet users in the province.

Miscellaneous
Handcrafts are abundant in Kastamonu, especially in rural areas. Most available are hand-woven textiles.
Several national and local annual festivities also take place in the province.
In a research conducted in the province, 812 different food are identified that are specific to the region.
The provincial soccer team Kastamonuspor competes in the Bank Asya 1st League (1st National Soccer League).
The founder of the Turkish republic, Atatürk had declared the "dress code reform", which abolished the fez, in Kastamonu in 1925.

References

External links 

  Kastamonu governor's official website
  Kastamonu municipality's official website
  Kastamonu weather forecast information
 Kastamonu culture & travel guide
 Pictures of the capital of Kastamonu province – with a link to the Kasaba village gallery
 Kastamonu Travel & Tourism Information